Resolution is a 2008 Western novel by Robert B. Parker.  It is a sequel to the 2005 novel, Appaloosa. It was followed in 2009 by Brimstone.

External links
 Resolution page at Parker's official site.

Western (genre) novels
2008 American novels
Sequel novels
Novels by Robert B. Parker